An amulet, also known as a good luck charm, is an object believed to confer protection upon its possessor. The "Amulets of Ancient Egypt" fall in approximately seven major categories:

 Amulets of gods/goddesses and sacred animals
 Amulets of protection (or aversion)
 The scarab for the living, (or for a funerary offering)
 Amulets of assimilation
 Amulets for powers
 Amulets of possessions, property, or as offerings
 (symbolism of materials)

The first usages are from time periods of: ED, Early Dynastic Period, FIP, First Intermediate Period, G-R, Graeco-Roman Period, LD, Late Dynastic Period, MK, Middle Kingdom, NK, New Kingdom, OK, Old Kingdom, SIP, Second Intermediate Period, and TIP, Third Intermediate Period.

Amulets of protection
Amulets of protection: animals, gods, goddesses, etc.

Ankh Amulet
S34-(life-symbol)

(seated)-block statue of: Cuboid Statue of Tety called Tetyty, (photo), British Museum

Bes Amulet
D2-(gardiner-(unlisted))-(sometimes-just-(face-of-bes))

(shiny boxwood statuette) Young Girl, (shaved head with youth side lock), Carrying oversized Pot
The Durham Servant Girl, (photo, Durham Museum)

Eye of Horus Amulet
D10-(eye-of-horus)

Gayer-Anderson cat, (donated to British Museum)

Eye of Horus Amulet, Thoth-Baboon statues
D10-(eye-of-horus)

Thoth-as Baboon, (Louvre)

Other types of plaque-necklaces on Thoth-baboon:

3-Fox-Skins

F31-(three-fox-skins)

vertical Painted Relief Panel of Iry, Scribe, ((correct vertical)-Painted Panel Relief of Iry. )

Fringed-Fabric ligatured w/ vertical S-(folded cloth)
S28-(fringed-fabric-with-(vertical-s-folded-cloth))

Heart amulet
F34-(heart)

Pectoral Necklace
S11-.-S17A-(pectoral-on-necklace-(approximate)

Unidentified amulet

F31-(three-fox-skins)

(two statues) Prince Rahotep, and wife Nofret

Amulet necklace statues of Senusret III

O39-(unknown)-.-F29-(f29-(pierced-hide) – (created by Senusret III(?), or from Kush country(?))Statues of Senusret III

Scarab amulets

Amulets of assimilation

2-Wine-Jars

W21-(two-wine-vessels)

(tomb relief) Maya (Egyptian) w/Staff and hieroglyph inscriptions–(Tomb of Maya)

{| class="wikitable sortable"
|- style="background:#efefef;"
!
! Amulet
! Egy. lang. equiv
! Discovered by
! Usage-or-Origin
! City/cemetery
! Notes
|-
| 
| 2-Wine-Jars amuleton necklace
| irp, 'wine'(Det.)
| Geoffrey Martin1986-(Re-working of Saqqara tombs-newly discovered tomb)
|
| Tomb of MayaMaya was Treasurer of Tutankhamun
| Abundance(no photo link, at present)(see Pectoral (Ancient Egypt))
|-
|}

References

 Andrews, Carol, 1994. Amulets of Ancient Egypt, chapter 4: Scarabs for the living and funerary scarabs, pp 50–59, Andrews, Carol, c 1993, University of Texas Press, 518 amulets, 1, or multiples included in 12 necklaces; (softcover)
Keller, 2000. Bowers Museum of Cultural Art, c 2000. Egyptian Treasure from the British Museum, Peter Keller, (Bowers), Robert Anderson, (British Museum), Carol A.R. Andrews, (British Museum), Relief Panel of Iry, p. 40-41. (softcover)
Reeves, 2000. Ancient Egypt, The Great Discoveries, a Year-by-Year Chronicle, Nicholas Reeves, (Thames and Hudson Ltd, London), c 2000. 1975: New Kingdom Tombs at Saqqara, pp. 215–219, Other tombs - and Maya, pp. 218–219. (1816-18): After 1816, The Durham Servant Girl''', p. 19. (hardcover)

External links
Attendant of Pharaoh Narmer, Wikicommons
The Durham Servant Girl-(photo), a boxwood kohl pot-(for kohl), Ancient Egyptian cosmetic containers; Article
(vertical)-Painted Panel Relief of Iry. 
Tomb of Ramose

Art of ancient Egypt
Necklaces
Sculptures of ancient Egypt
Amulet